"Sensual Seduction", also known as "Sexual Eruption", is a song by American rapper Snoop Dogg. It was released on November 20, 2007 as the first single of his ninth studio album Ego Trippin', with the record label Geffen Records. The song was produced by Shawty Redd. Snoop Dogg sings the majority of the song using Auto-Tune. The video's style visually references the style of Roger Troutman, as part of its retro imagery.

Writing and background
Snoop Dogg originally heard the single "Drifter", produced by Atlanta-based producer Fatboi, and was prepared to purchase the song. Snoop Dogg's cousin — So So Def affiliate rapper-producer Daz Dillinger — began to facilitate mediations between the two artists. Dillinger, in a good connection with Shawty Redd, organized an arrangement in which Shawty agreed to send Dillinger the rights, but also offered to make an exclusive track for Snoop with a similar sound to that of "Drifter". Daz also organized an audition meeting for the two while Snoop was touring Georgia. Shawty Redd was unable to attend the meeting, but later conversed about the beat with Snoop via telephone. He sent a demo instrumental to Los Angeles, and was ultimately surprised by the changes Snoop made to the track. Originally, Redd didn't intend to use the auto-tuned effect on the vocals. The tape was sent back, vocals included, and Shawty began to play it in his local club. The song was leaked in early October 2007. This song was released as downloadable content for the Rock Band series.

Music video
The music video for "Sensual Seduction" was directed by Melina and produced by Steven Johnson, and premiered November 28, 2007 on MTV. The video features Snoop in retro eighties outfits holding a keytar while using a talkbox, and includes direct homages to Prince's "When Doves Cry" video. It also features him in a retro seventies outfit dancing in a colored background. It is the second time Snoop Dogg has made a retro style video. The first was in "Doggy Dogg World". MADtv parodied this video as "Sensible Deduction," featuring Keegan-Michael Key as Snoop Dogg. A remixed version of the video as Wideboys Club Mix also exists, and sees Snoop Dogg singing in the Wideboys club, while the club dancers are seeing dancing in background. The models in the video are Gina Choe, Eugena Washington, and Nancy Olivares.

Remixes
There are 2 official remixes of the song, the first remix using the clean version, "Sensual Seduction", and featuring Lil' Kim. The second remix uses both versions of the song and is called "Sensual Seduction (Fyre Department Remix)" or "Sexual Eruption (Fyre Department Remix)", and features Swedish artist Robyn and Snoop's 1st and 3rd verses are switched; on the clean version of this remix, the word "bitch" was not censored.  Other unofficial remixes features Chicago rapper Yung Berg, Australian DJ Dirty South, and British DJs the Wideboys. There is also an unofficial remix by Skrillex called "Sexual Seduction". A remix called "The Art of Sensual Seduction" has not been officially released, although it is available in online shops, and a merengue/hip hop remix produced by Guary & Cleyton has been released titled "Seduccion Sensual".

Versions
Album Version (as it appears on Ego Trippin' titled "Sexual Eruption")
"Sensual Seduction" (Radio Edit)
"Sensual Seduction" [Remix] featuring Lil' Kim (Official Remix #1)
"Sensual Seduction" [Fyre Department Remix] featuring Robyn (Official Remix #2)
"Sensual Seduction" (Wideboys Club Mix)
"Sensual Eruption" DPG Mix featuring Kurupt & Daz
"Sensual Eruption" (David Garcia & High Spies Remix)
"Sensual Eruption" (Boys Noize Remix)
"Sensual Eruption" (Dirty South Remix)
"Sensual Seduction" [Solly Bmore Remix]
"Sexual Eruption" [Simon Sez Remix] featuring Snoop Dogg & Busta Rhymes
"Sexual Eruption" [Instrumental]
"Sexual Seduction" (Skrillex Remix)

Commercial performance
In the United States, the single debuted at number 76 on the Billboard Hot 100 chart, dated on December 15, 2007. The song peaked at number seven on the Billboard Hot 100, making it Snoop Dogg's fifth top-ten single as a lead artist and eleventh overall. As of February 2009, "Sexual Eruption" sold 869,000 digital downloads in the United States.

Charts

Weekly charts

Year-end charts

Video credits
Melina, director for Black Dog Films
Steven Johnson, producer
Factory Features, production co
Omer Ganai, DP |
Jarrett Fijal, editor
Baked FX, vfx

See also 
 List of Billboard Hot 100 top 10 singles in 2008

References

External links
Snoop Dogg on Myspace
Music video for "Sensual Seduction"

2007 songs
2007 singles
Music videos directed by Melina Matsoukas
Number-one singles in Turkey
Snoop Dogg songs
Songs written by Snoop Dogg
Song recordings produced by Shawty Redd
Geffen Records singles
Dirty rap songs
Funk songs
American contemporary R&B songs